Gour Kishore Ghosh Metro Station is a station of Line 6 of the Kolkata Metro near the Chingrighata crossing at Sukant Nagar in Bidhannagar. The station is named in honour of famous Bengali writer and journalist, Gour Kishore Ghosh.

See also
List of Kolkata Metro stations

Kolkata Metro stations
Railway stations in Kolkata